"Hvad der sker her" is a song performed by Danish R&B, Hip-Hop and pop duo Nik & Ras. It was released on 4 September 2012 as a digital download in Denmark on iTunes. The song features vocals from Danish pop, dance and R&B singer and songwriter Medina. The song peaked at number 5 on the Danish Singles Chart.

Track listing

Chart performance

Release history

References

2012 singles
Hip hop songs
2012 songs
Songs written by Medina (singer)